Edward Alexander (1936 – August 22, 2020) was an American essayist and professor emeritus of English at the University of Washington. He focused his research on literary figures such as John Stuart Mill, Matthew Arnold, John Morley, John Ruskin, Isaac Bashevis Singer, Lionel Trilling, Irving Howe, and Robert B. Heilman; and authored books about Jewish history, Zionism, and antisemitism.

Life
Edward Alexander was born in Brooklyn, New York. He grew up in the Brownsville section where he attended a Hebrew school located on 500 Herzl Street. As a youth, he idolized Jackie Robinson and David Ben-Gurion.

Alexander earned an A.B. from Columbia College in 1957. He then attended the University of Minnesota, where he received an A.M. in 1959, and a Ph.D. in 1963.

Alexander was awarded a Guggenheim Fellowship in 1974 in the field of "Literary Criticism".

Alexander taught English at the University of Washington from 1960–2004 and was the first chairman of UW's Jewish Studies Program. He was a visiting professor at Tufts, Hebrew University, Tel-Aviv University, and Memphis State University.

Alexander was a member the Association of Literary Scholars, Critics, and Writers, the National Association of Scholars, and the Washington Association of Scholars.

Alexander had several cancer surgeries in 2009–2010.

Writing
In The Jewish Idea and Its Enemies (1988), Alexander examined the tension between The Enlightenment ideas of liberalism, rationalism, relativism, and traditional Jewish ideas.

In Jews against Themselves (2015), Alexander explored the contributions apostate Jews made to "the politics and ideology of anti-Semitism."

Books

References

1936 births
2020 deaths
Jewish American academics
American male essayists
Writers from Brooklyn
University of Washington faculty
Columbia College (New York) alumni
University of Minnesota alumni
Scholars of antisemitism
Historians of the Holocaust
People from Brownsville, Brooklyn